The list shown below shows the France national football team all-time international record against opposing nations. The stats are composed of FIFA World Cup, UEFA European Championship, UEFA Nations League, FIFA Confederations Cup, and Summer Olympics matches, as well as numerous international friendly tournaments and matches.

The France national football team represents the nation of France in international football. It is fielded by the French Football Federation and competes as a member of UEFA. The team played its first official match on 1 May 1904 against Belgium. France and Belgium have since contested 75 official matches against each other, the most all-time between each team. Aside from Belgium, France have contested matches against almost 90 other national teams. Of the 90 teams, France have not lost to 40 of them having earned a perfect winning percentage against 26 of the teams. France have also not beaten two teams; the Ireland national team from 1882 to 1950 and Senegal. France have contested these two teams only once.

Competition records

FIFA World Cup record

UEFA European Championship record

UEFA Nations League record 

*Draws include knockout matches decided on penalty kicks.
**Group stage played home and away. Flag shown represents host nation for the finals stage.
**Red border indicates the finals stage will be held on home soil

FIFA Confederations Cup record

Head-to-head record 

Updated as after Argentina vs. France on 18 December 2022.

Notes

External links
 France all-time competition records

All-time record
France national football team records and statistics
National association football team all-time records